Grand Theater station may refer to

Metro stations
Grand Theater station (Shenzhen Metro), a metro station in Shenzhen, China that opened in 2004.
Grand Theater station (Chongqing Rail Transit), a metro station in Chongqing, China that opened in 2014.
Guangzhou Opera House station, a metro station in Guangzhou, China that opened in 2010.